Whitesnake are a British-American hard rock band originally from Middlesbrough. Formed in 1978, the group originally consisted of vocalist David Coverdale, guitarists Micky Moody and Bernie Marsden, bassist Neil Murray, drummer Dave Dowle and keyboardist Brian Johnston. The current lineup of the band includes Coverdale, drummer Tommy Aldridge (from 1987 to 1990, 2003 to 2007, and since 2013), guitarists Reb Beach and Joel Hoekstra (since 2003 and 2014, respectively), keyboardists Michele Luppi (since 2015) and Dino Jelusick (since 2021) and bassist Tanya O'Callaghan (also since 2021).

History

1978–1986
Following the release and promotion of his debut solo album White Snake in 1977, vocalist David Coverdale formed the band of the same name the following February, with the initial lineup including guitarists and backing vocalists Micky Moody and Bernie Marsden, bassist Neil Murray, drummer Dave "Duck" Dowle and touring keyboardist Brian Johnston. After their first few shows, the group replaced Johnston with Peter Solley (although he was still credited as a "special guest", rather than a full member) and recorded their debut EP Snakebite. By August, Solley had also been replaced by Jon Lord, Coverdale's former bandmate in Deep Purple, in time for the recording of their debut album Trouble. Dowle was replaced in July 1979 after the recording of Lovehunter by Ian Paice, another Deep Purple alumnus. After Ready an' Willing and Come an' Get It, Whitesnake were placed on hiatus by Coverdale in early 1982, during which time Marsden, Murray and Paice all left the band for other projects.

Coverdale reformed the group in October 1982, with Moody and Lord joined by new guitarist Mel Galley, bassist Colin Hodgkinson and drummer Cozy Powell. After the recording of Slide It In, Moody and Hodgkinson left in December 1983, with John Sykes and the returning Neil Murray taking their places. Both new members featured on the US reissue of the album, which featured re-recorded tracks. A few dates into the subsequent tour, Galley broke his arm and was forced to leave the band, who completed the shows as a five-piece. Lord also left in April to rejoin his former bandmates in reforming Deep Purple. Whitesnake subsequently continued performing as a four-piece, adding Richard Bailey as a touring keyboardist throughout the rest of the year. After two Rock in Rio performances in January 1985, Powell then left to form Emerson, Lake & Powell. A few months later, the band started recording their self-titled album with new drummer Aynsley Dunbar and session keyboardist Don Airey.

1987–1997
After it was completed the previous year, Whitesnake was released in 1987. Shortly before its release, Coverdale put together an all-new lineup which included former Dio guitarist Vivian Campbell, former Vandenberg guitarist Adrian Vandenberg, and former Ozzy Osbourne bassist and drummer Rudy Sarzo and Tommy Aldridge. After the end of the album's touring cycle, Campbell left the band. He was replaced the next April by Steve Vai, formerly of David Lee Roth's solo band. Vai performed all guitars on the group's next album Slip of the Tongue, after Vandenberg suffered a wrist injury that prevented him from playing. For the album's touring cycle, Rick Seratte joined on live keyboards. At the end of the tour in September 1990, Coverdale chose to disband Whitesnake.

In 1994, Coverdale revived Whitesnake following the breakup of Coverdale•Page, touring between June and October in promotion of Greatest Hits. The band's lineup included returning members Vandenberg and Sarzo, in addition to Ratt guitarist Warren DeMartini, former Coverdale•Page touring drummer Denny Carmassi, and backup keyboardist Paul Mirkovich. At the end of the run, the group's contract with Geffen Records expired and they disbanded again. A second reformation followed in 1997, when Coverdale, Vandenberg and Carmassi reunited alongside former Coverdale•Page touring members Guy Pratt (bass) and Brett Tuggle (keyboards) for Restless Heart. The album was initially intended to be a Coverdale solo release, however due to pressure from his new label EMI Records it was branded a Whitesnake album. The tour, which ran from September to December 1997, featured Vandenberg and Carmassi, plus guitarist Steve Farris, bassist Tony Franklin and keyboardist Derek Hilland.

2003 onwards
After a five-year break, it was announced in December 2002 that Whitesnake would reformed for a tour the following year, with drummer Tommy Aldridge returning alongside new members Doug Aldrich and Reb Beach on guitars, Marco Mendoza on bass, and Timothy Drury on keyboards. In April 2005, Mendoza left to pursue "other musical avenues", with Uriah Duffy taking his place the following month. In December 2007, it was also announced that Aldridge had departed, with Chris Frazier having taken his place to record drums for Good to Be Bad, the first Whitesnake studio album since 1997. Both Frazier and Duffy had left by June 2010, with Brian Tichy and Michael Devin taking their places, respectively. Drury left to pursue a solo career in September, with his place taken on the Forevermore touring cycle by Brian Ruedy. After two years of touring, Tichy left in January 2013 and was replaced by Aldridge a few weeks later. Aldrich later left in May 2014, citing a desire to start a solo career.

Aldrich's place in the band was taken by Night Ranger guitarist Joel Hoekstra in August 2014. The following year saw the release of The Purple Album, a collection of recordings of tracks from Coverdale's time in Deep Purple. Shortly after the album's release, Michele Luppi was enlisted as Whitesnake's new keyboardist. Flesh & Blood followed in 2019. In July 2021, Whitesnake recruited Dino Jelusick for their 2022 farewell tour, turning Whitesnake into a septet for the first time. Later that November, Michael Devin parted ways with the band. He was replaced by Tanya O'Callaghan.

Members

Current members

Former members

Session/touring musicians

Session musicians

Timeline

Lineups

References

External links
Whitesnake official website

Lists of members by band